The International Defence Industry Fair or İDEF is a defence industry fair held in Turkey and organized by the Turkish Armed Forces Foundation since 1993. The TAF Foundation organizes the IDEF once in every two years and before each fair it chooses the organizer firm and exhibition venue by calling a tender. The exhibitions generally take place in Ankara or Istanbul.

The fair has been held every odd year since 1993. IDEF, as a high technology defence industry fair, incorporating main defence industry branches and their subordinates, is an essential international marketing arena for defence industry companies. IDEF is the biggest defence industry fair in Eurasian region and one of the top four in the world with an increasing trend in terms of the number of participating countries, delegations and companies.

See also
 Saha Expo, Defense, Aviation and Aerospace Fair in Istanbul
 IDEAS, Pakistani biannual Defense exhibition in Karachi

References

Notes

External links 
IDEF 2017 Official Website

Arms fairs
Fairs in Turkey
1993 establishments in Turkey
Recurring events established in 1993
Economy of Istanbul
Economy of Ankara
Post–Cold War military equipment of Turkey